Caloreas charmonica is a moth in the family Choreutidae. It was described by Walsingham in 1914. It is found in Mexico.

References

Natural History Museum Lepidoptera generic names catalog

Choreutidae
Moths described in 1914